"There's No You" is a popular song written by Harold S. Hopper better known as Hal Hopper with lyrics by Tom Adair. The song was first published in 1944.

Two of the best-known versions of the song were recorded in 1944 by Jo Stafford and Frank Sinatra. Stafford's version was recorded on December 13, 1944 and it reached No, 7 in the Billboard charts in 1945. Sinatra's first recording of the song was made on November 14, 1944.

Other notable recordings 
 Vic Damone (1955).
 Miles Davis - Blue Moods (1955)
 June Christy - The Misty Miss Christy (1956)
 Frank Sinatra - Where Are You (1957)
 Ray Charles - The Great Ray Charles (1957)
 Louis Armstrong - Louis Armstrong Meets Oscar Peterson (1957)
 Betty Carter - The Modern Sound of Betty Carter (1960)
 Johnny Mathis - for his album Johnny's Mood (1960)
 Sarah Vaughan - Close to You (1960)
 Stacey Kent - Close Your Eyes (1997)
 Diana Krall - This Dream of You (2020)

References

External links
 There's No You at Jazzstandards.com
 List of recordings  at AllMusic

1944 songs
Songs written by Tom Adair
Frank Sinatra songs
Jo Stafford songs
1940s jazz standards